The 1947 Youngstown Penguins football team was an American football team that represented Youngstown University (now known as Youngstown State University) as an independent during the 1947 college football season. In its ninth season under head coach Dike Beede, the team compiled an 8–2 record. The team played its home games at Rayen Stadium.

Schedule

References

Youngstown
Youngstown State Penguins football seasons
Youngstown Penguins football